Dry Island Buffalo Jump Provincial Park is a provincial park in Central Alberta, Canada, located about  southeast of Red Deer and  east of Trochu. The park is situated along the Red Deer River and features badlands topography.

It is the site of an ancient buffalo jump, where Cree native people drove bison over the cliffs in large numbers to provide for their tribes. The hills also contain unique flora and fauna that are not found this far east of Alberta's Rocky Mountains in as large numbers as at Dry Island. The park contains the most important Albertosaurus bone bed in the world, which was first discovered by Barnum Brown in 1910 and rediscovered by Dr. Phil Currie in 1997. The bone bed excavation was halted at the end of August 2005. Dr. Currie left the Royal Tyrrell Museum in October 2005 to become the Canada Research Chair with the Biological Sciences Department at the University of Alberta. Under university auspices, excavation at the bone bed continued in the summers of 2006, 2007 and 2008.

Activities

The following activities are available in the park:
Birdwatching (with 150 bird species spotted, including turkey vulture, golden eagle, red-tailed hawk,  Swainson's hawk, prairie falcon, white pelican, mountain bluebird, belted kingfisher and other warblers, great blue heron, marbled godwit, peregrine falcon and willet)
Camping (two campgrounds are maintained: Tolman East and Tolman West)
Canoeing and kayaking
Fishing (brook trout, brown trout, bull trout, burbot, westslope cutthroat trout, emerald shiner, goldeye, lake chub, lake sturgeon, lake whitefish, longnose dace, longnose sucker, mooneye, mountain sucker, mountain whitefish, northern pike, quillback, rainbow trout, sauger, shorthead redhorse, spoonhead sculpin, Trout-perch, walleye, white sucker, yellow perch)
Scenic viewing

See also
List of provincial parks in Alberta
List of Canadian provincial parks
List of National Parks of Canada

References

External links

Provincial parks of Alberta
Buffalo jumps
Kneehill County
Starland County
County of Stettler No. 6
1970 establishments in Alberta
Protected areas established in 1970